The Men's skeet event at the 2010 South American Games was held on March 25 and March 26.

Individual

Medalists

Results

Qualification

Final

Team

Medalists

Results

References
Qualification
Final
Team

Skeet M